Chirikkudukka is a 1976 Indian Malayalam-language comedy film directed by A. B. Raj and produced by Baby. The film stars Prem Nazir, Vidhubala, Thikkurissy Sukumaran Nair, Bahadoor, Sudheer and Jose Prakash. It is a remake of the 1958 Tamil film Sabaash Meena. The film was released on 30 April 1976.

Plot

Cast 

Prem Nazir as Preman
Vidhubala as Radha
Bahadoor as Babu
Thikkurissy Sukumaran Nair as Sadasivan Nair
Jose Prakash as Kumar
Sudheer as Chandran Menon
Sankaradi as Keshavan Nair
T. R. Omana as Lakshmi
Rani Chandra as Malathi
T. S. Muthaiah as Radha's Father
Pattom Sadan as Naanu
KPAC Lalitha as Sarasa
Manavalan Joseph as Kochachan
Prema as Bhargavi
Cochin Haneefa as Vasu
Khadeeja
Mallika Sukumaran as Appakari Mariya
T. K. Balachandran
T. P. Madhavan as Gopalan Nair
Maniyanpilla Raju (Uncredited)
C. M. Abraham
Priyan Pazhanji

Soundtrack 
The music was composed by Shankar–Ganesh and the lyrics were written by Yusufali Kechery.

References

External links 
 

1970s Malayalam-language films
1976 comedy films
1976 films
Films directed by A. B. Raj
Films scored by Shankar–Ganesh
Indian comedy films
Malayalam remakes of Tamil films